Beaverton is an unincorporated community in Valley County, Montana, United States located near Beaver Creek on the Valley County/Phillips County line. The community itself is all but a ghost town, with First Creek Seeds being the only remaining feature. Beaverton is halfway between the town of Saco and the community of Hinsdale.

1950 is the last year Beaverton was included as its own district in the U.S. Census.

References

Unincorporated communities in Montana
Unincorporated communities in Valley County, Montana